Sigitas is a masculine Lithuanian given name. Notable people with the name include:
Sigitas Geda (1943–2008), Lithuanian poet, translator, playwright, essayist, critic and politician
Sigitas Jakubauskas (born 1958), Lithuanian footballer 
Sigitas Parulskis (born 1965), Lithuanian poet, essayist, playwright and reviewer
Sigitas Kučinskas (born 1963), Lithuanian rower 
Sigitas Tamkevičius (born 1938), Lithuanian cardinal of the Roman Catholic Church

Lithuanian masculine given names